Montana is a locality and small rural community in the local government area of Meander Valley in the North West region of Tasmania.
The 2016 census determined a population of 56 for the state suburb of Montana.

History
The locality was originally called Cheshunt Park. The name was changed to Montana in 1912.

Geography
The Meander River forms the eastern boundary of the locality.

Road infrastructure
The C166 route (Long Ridge Road) enters the locality from the south-east and exits to the north-east. The C164 route (Montana Road) starts at an intersection with route C166 in the south-east and runs north through the locality and village before exiting.

References

Localities of Meander Valley Council
Towns in Tasmania